Robert J. "Bob" Miller (born July 25, 1953) is an American journalist, media personality, musician and politician.  He was a Democratic member of the Alaska House of Representatives for one term during the 27th Alaska State Legislature. He represented the 7th district which was located in the Fairbanks North Star Borough in Interior Alaska.

Early life
Bob Miller was born on July 25, 1953, in Washington, D.C., and raised in Maryland. He graduated from Bladensburg Senior High School and went on to earn a Bachelor of Arts from Towson State College in 1975. He moved to Fairbanks, Alaska, the hometown of his wife Joni, where he worked as a television anchor and musician. He plays both the guitar and banjo.

Political career
In 2010, Miller defeated incumbent Republican Mike Kelly. He lost his reelection campaign to Republican and fellow incumbent Tammie Wilson.

References

External links
 Bob Miller at 100 Years of Alaska's Legislature

1953 births
21st-century American politicians
American television news anchors
Living people
Democratic Party members of the Alaska House of Representatives
People from Bladensburg, Maryland
Politicians from Fairbanks, Alaska
Towson University alumni